Jean Rigby (born 22 December 1954) is an English opera and concert singer. A mezzo-soprano, she is a long-time principal with the English National Opera.

Biography
Born in Fleetwood, Lancashire, Rigby studied at the Birmingham School of Music and the Royal Academy of Music. She made her debut with the English National Opera in 1977. She has sung with the Royal Opera and has been for many years a regular guest at the Glyndebourne Festival. At the 2008 Glyndebourne festival, she created the role of Martina Laborde in Peter Eötvös' opera Love and Other Demons. In the field of concert music, she has been a frequent soloist at the BBC Promenade Concerts.

She is an opera coach at the Royal Academy of Music and a Patron of Bampton Classical Opera. She was a member of the jury for the company's Young Singers' Competition in 2019.

References

External links
Hyperion Records biography

1954 births
Living people
Operatic mezzo-sopranos
People from Fleetwood
Alumni of Birmingham Conservatoire
Alumni of the Royal Academy of Music
Musicians from Lancashire
English mezzo-sopranos
20th-century British women opera singers
21st-century British women opera singers